Sumly Chan Yuen-sum (born 23 March 1958 in Hong Kong) is a social worker and politician in Hong Kong, a member of the Civic Party, the chairman and the member of Tsuen Wan District Council (Lei Muk Shue East). He has served as district councillor in Tsuen Wan since 1985 and is one of the Hong Kong district councillors with the longest years of service.

Political Life

Democratic Party

In 2003, Chan claimed the name of "" headed by Albert Chan to take part in the District Council election, and renewed the seat successfully. In 2004, he joined Hong Kong Democratic Party and partnered with Lee Wing-tat, the former chairman of the Democratic Party to participate in the 2004 Hong Kong legislative election, but failed to enter the Legislative Council. In September 2007, he quit Democratic Party and joined Civic Party.

Civic Party

In November 2007, he succeeded in keeping the seat of the district council. In 2008, Fernando Cheung and Chan represented Civic Party to participate in the 2008 Hong Kong legislative election, but both Cheung and he lost. 
In 2016, he was nominated by Civic Party to run for the District Council (Second) constituency. He spent plenty of time in finding his 15 nominees (they must be a district councillor) which caused him to start his campaign later than others. As a result, he was constantly ranked either sixth or seventh in the rolling poll which caused him to suspend his campaign on 2 September 2016 in order to have at least three pan-democrats to take the District Council (Second) seat. Leung Yiu-chung, who was then elected in the District Council (Second) election was somehow actually helped by Sumly. Sumly was meant to have 16 nominees with him. However, one of them is duplicated with Leung. Therefore, Sumly decided to forfeit it in order to let Leung enter the race.

External links

 Sumly Chan's Info in Hong Kong District Council website
 Sumly Chan's info in Hong Kong Democratic Party
 To Sumly Chan disaffection (Chinese)

1958 births
Members of the Regional Council of Hong Kong
District councillors of Tsuen Wan District
Hong Kong social workers
Living people
Civic Party politicians
Democratic Party (Hong Kong) politicians
Members of the Election Committee of Hong Kong, 2017–2021